Dan the Automator Presents 2K7 is a soundtrack album to the NBA 2K7 video game. It was released on Decon in 2006. Compiled by Dan the Automator, it features guest appearances from Ghostface, E-40, Slim Thug, Lupe Fiasco, Mos Def, Rhymefest, and members of Dilated Peoples and Jurassic 5. An instrumental version of the album was released afterwards.

Critical reception

Marisa Brown of AllMusic gave the album 4 out of 5 stars, calling it "a pretty nice assortment of styles and sounds that ... flows really well thanks to Dan's consistently good and interesting production." Dan Raper of PopMatters gave the album 4 out of 10 stars, writing, "it makes us doubt Dan the Automator still has what it takes to produce a hip-hop compilation that is at all compelling."

Track listing

Charts

References

External links
 

2006 compilation albums
Dan the Automator albums
Decon albums
Sponsored compilation albums